Karl Leo Schultz is a retired United States Coast Guard admiral who served as the 26th Commandant of the Coast Guard from 2018 to 2022.

Early life and education
Schultz is a native of East Hartford, Connecticut. He graduated from the United States Coast Guard Academy in 1983 with a Bachelor of Science degree in civil engineering. He then earned a Master of Public Administration from the University of Connecticut in 1992 and completed a one-year National Security Fellowship at the Kennedy School of Government in 2006.

Career

United States Coast Guard
Staff assignments include Chief of the Office of Congressional and Governmental Affairs; Congressional Liaison Officer to the United States House of Representatives; Liaison Officer to the United States Department of State, Bureau of International Narcotics and Law Enforcement Affairs; Assignment Officer at the Coast Guard Personnel Command, and Command Duty Officer in the Seventh Coast Guard District Operations Center in Miami.

Schultz has served as Director of Operations (J3), United States Southern Command in Doral, Florida where he directed joint service military operations across the Caribbean Basin, Central and South America. Prior flag officer assignments were Commander, Eleventh Coast Guard District, where he was responsible for multi-mission operations from California to Peru, and Director of Governmental and Public Affairs at Coast Guard Headquarters in Washington, D.C., where he was responsible for external engagement with Congress, the media, and inter-governmental entities.

Schultz assumed the duties as Commander, Coast Guard Atlantic Area in August 2016. As commander, Schultz oversaw Coast Guard rescue and recovery efforts for hurricanes Harvey, Irma, Maria, and Nate in 2017.

Commandant of the Coast Guard
On March 8, 2018, Homeland Security Secretary Kirstjen Nielsen announced that President Donald Trump intended to nominate Schultz for the position of Commandant of the United States Coast Guard, succeeding Admiral Paul F. Zukunft. His nomination and promotion to admiral was confirmed by a voice vote of the United States Senate on May 9, 2018. Schultz relieved Zukunft on June 1, 2018.

His tenure as commandant ended on June 1, 2022, and he retired later that day.

Awards and decorations

References

External links

 USCG Commandant profile

Commandants of the United States Coast Guard
Living people
People from East Hartford, Connecticut
Military personnel from Connecticut
Recipients of the Defense Superior Service Medal
Recipients of the Legion of Merit
United States Coast Guard Academy alumni
United States Coast Guard admirals
University of Connecticut alumni
Year of birth missing (living people)